Federal magistrate may refer to:

Federal Magistrates Court of Australia
United States magistrate judge

See also 
Federal judge
Magistrate